Thathan Buzurg is a village located in the Hajipur block of Vaishali district, Bihar, India. The Hajipur is the closest town and is 6 km from the village.

The village is governed by a gram panchayat which also includes other villages.

References

Villages in Vaishali district